Soehrensia camarguensis,  is a species of Soehrensia found in Bolivia. It was once thought to be a species of Echinopsis.

First published in Cactaceae Syst. Init. 28: 30 (2012)

References

External links
 
 

Flora of Bolivia
camarguensis